Mabel Maame Agyemang (formerly also Yamoa) is the current Chief Justice of the Turks and Caicos Islands. An expert superior court judge with a judicial career spanning decades, Justice Agyemang served in the judiciaries of the governments of Ghana, The Gambia and Eswatini prior to her current role in the Turks and Caicos Islands. She was also the first female Chief Justice of The Gambia.

Early life and education 
Justice Agyemang had her secondary school education at Wesley Girls Senior High School in Cape Coast. She attended the University of Ghana and then furthered her education at the Ghana School of Law (Professional Law Course).

Judicial career
Justice Agyemang was called to the Ghanaian Bar in 1987 and joined the Bench shortly after. As a Ghanaian judge, she served in various judicial capacities and sat in a number of jurisdictions including Accra, Cape Coast, Koforidua, Kumasi, and Tema. She also served as vice-president of the Association of Magistrates and Judges of Ghana from 1996 to 2000. She was elevated to the High Court in 2002.

Commonwealth Secretariat Judge 
She began working for the Commonwealth Secretariat as an expert judge in 2004, first being sent to The Gambia where she spent four years as a High Court judge. During her four-year tenure in The Gambia, Justice Agyemang served the Land, Civil, Commercial and Criminal divisions and successfully completed about 365 files. In 2008, she was seconded to Eswatini where she served for two years in a similar capacity. Her cases in Eswatini spanned both private and public law and included cases on defamation, unlawful arrests, police brutality and electoral disputes. One of her notable judgments in Eswatini was her judgment on the right to free education. Justice Agyemang returned to The Gambia in 2010, still with the Commonwealth Secretariat, as an expert Appeal Court Judge.

Chief Justice of The Gambia 
She was appointed Chief Justice of The Gambia in August 2013. Her appointment was widely seen as an inspired choice as she is seen by the international community as an experienced and independent minded judge. She served until her abrupt removal in February 2014. There was no official reason given by the Gambian government as to the cause of dismissal. It is suspected by many in the international judicial community that her dismissal was tied to differences over a human rights abuse case and her insistence on judicial independence.

Back to Ghana (Court of Appeal) 
Upon returning to her native Ghana, Justice Agyemang was sworn in as a Justice of the Ghana Court of Appeal. In October 2015, while speaking at the opening ceremony of a new judicial complex in Accra, Ghanaian President John Dramani Mahama cited Justice Agyemang as an example of highly respected judges within the Ghanaian judiciary.

Chief Justice of the Turks and Caicos Islands 
In February 2020, Nigel Dakin, Governor of the Turks and Caicos Islands, announced the appointment of Justice Agyemang as Chief Justice of the Turks and Caicos Islands. In his announcement speech, Governor Dakin noted of Agyemang's sudden departure from The Gambia in 2014:  He went on to relay, as he stated, "evidence provided by the Bar Council in The Gambia", of her value and influence in the role:   

Justice Agyemang was sworn in as Chief Justice of the Turks and Caicos Islands on March 30, 2020, and took office on April 1, 2020.

Personal life
Justice Agyemang is a devout Christian and is married with two children.

See also
 Judiciary of Ghana
 Commonwealth Secretariat

References

Living people
20th-century Ghanaian judges
Ghanaian judges on the courts of the Gambia
University of Ghana alumni
Ghana School of Law alumni
People educated at Wesley Girls' Senior High School
Year of birth missing (living people)
Ghanaian judges on the courts of Eswatini
Chief justices of the Gambia
Chief justices of the Turks and Caicos Islands
Ghanaian women judges
Women chief justices
21st-century Ghanaian judges
20th-century women judges
21st-century women judges